Tuure Vihtori Mäntynen (born 17 January 2000) is a Finnish footballer.

Career
At the age of 15, Mäntynen debuted for Jazz in the Finnish second division.

In 2017, he signed for German second division side Kaiserslautern after trialing for Reading and Stoke City in England.

In 2020, he signed for Finnish top flight team Ilves.

References

External links
 

2000 births
People from Eurajoki
Living people
Finnish footballers
Finland youth international footballers
Association football defenders
FC Jazz players
Ilves players
1. FC Kaiserslautern II players
Veikkausliiga players
Finnish expatriate footballers
Expatriate footballers in Germany
Finnish expatriate sportspeople in Germany
Sportspeople from Satakunta